Carry It On is the first soundtrack album (and thirteenth overall) by Joan Baez to the documentary film of the same name, released in 1971. Its title is taken from one of its songs, "Carry It On", which was written by Gil Turner.

The film chronicles the events taking place in the months immediately before the incarceration of Joan's husband at the time, David Harris, in 1969.

Track listing

 "Oh Happy Day" (Edwin Hawkins) – 3:43
 "Carry It On" (Gil Turner) – 3:48
 "In Forty Days" ("Joan & David") – 3:22
 "Hickory Wind" (Gram Parsons, Bob Buchanan) – 3:16
 "The Last Thing on My Mind" (Tom Paxton) – 3:29
 "Life Is Sacred" (David) – 2:02
 "Joe Hill" (Robinson, Hayes) – 3:53
 "I Shall Be Released" (Dylan) – 3:33
 "Do Right Woman, Do Right Man" (assisted by Jeffrey Shurtleff) (Dan Penn, Chips Moman) – 4:21
 "Love Is Just A Four-Letter Word" (Bob Dylan) – 4:05
 "Suzanne" (Leonard Cohen) – 4:54
 "Idols and Heroes" (David) – 2:30
 "We Shall Overcome" (Horton, Frank Hamilton, Guy Carawan, Pete Seeger) – 4:45

Personnel 

Joan Baez – Guitar, Vocals
Georgette Cartwright – Creative Services Coordinator
Richard Festinger – Guitar
Bob Fitch – Photography
Jules Halfant – Art Direction
Dave Harris – Vocals, Performer
David Harris – Performer
Arthur Levy – Liner Notes
Norman Moore – Art Direction, Design
Mark Spector – Reissue Producer
Captain Jeff Zaraya – Engineer

References

External links 
 Carry It On at the IMDB

Joan Baez albums
1971 soundtrack albums
Documentary film soundtracks
Vanguard Records soundtracks
Single-artist film soundtracks